The Priest and the Girl is a 1966 Brazilian drama film directed by Joaquim Pedro de Andrade, based on Carlos Drummond de Andrade's poem of the same name.  The directorial debut of Andrade, it was shot on São Gonçalo dos Rios das Pedras, Gruta de Maquiné, and Espinhaço Mountains, all locations of Minas Gerais.

Plot
It is set in 1965 in São Gonçalo dos Rios das Pedras, a district of Serro, Minas Gerais. A newly ordained priest arrives at the town and meets Fortunato, an influential merchant, and his concubine, Mariana. The girl's father, a prospector, died when she was ten and she was raised by Fortunato. When she becomes older, Fortunato wants to marry Mariana, but she and the priest run away together.

Cast
 Helena Ignez as Mariana
 Paulo José as Priest
 Mário Lago as Fortunato
 Fauzi Arap as Vitorino
 Rosa Sandrini as Devotee

Reception
It won the Prêmio Governador do Estado da Guanabara (lit. "State of Guanabara Governor Award") from the Comissão de Auxílio à Indústria Cinematográfica do Rio de Janeiro (lit. "Commission for Assistance to the Film Industry of Rio de Janeiro") in 1965. It was entered into the 16th Berlin International Film Festival.

References

External links

1966 drama films
1966 films
1966 directorial debut films
1960s Portuguese-language films
Brazilian black-and-white films
Brazilian drama films
Films directed by Joaquim Pedro de Andrade
Films set in 1965
Films shot in Minas Gerais